Pugh-Boykin House is a historic home located at Clinton, Sampson County, North Carolina.   It was built about 1855, and is a two-story, double-pile, side hall plan, Greek Revival style frame dwelling.  It has a hipped roof, hip roof porch, and paneled corner pilasters.

It was added to the National Register of Historic Places in 1986.

References

Houses on the National Register of Historic Places in North Carolina
Greek Revival houses in North Carolina
Houses completed in 1855
Houses in Sampson County, North Carolina
National Register of Historic Places in Sampson County, North Carolina